Walter Lee Robb (April 25, 1928 – March 23, 2020) was an American engineer, business executive, and philanthropist.

Born in Harrisburg, Pennsylvania, in April 1928, he was a recipient of the National Medal of Technology and Innovation in 1993. He was a Research & Development (R&D) executive for General Electric. He owned a few local sports teams, purchasing the minor-league hockey franchise of the Albany River Rats in 1998.

Robb died from COVID-19 on March 23, 2020, at the age of 91.

References

1928 births
2020 deaths
20th-century American businesspeople
20th-century American engineers
21st-century American businesspeople
21st-century American engineers
American business executives
American sports owners
Businesspeople from Pennsylvania
Deaths from the COVID-19 pandemic in New York (state)
Engineers from Pennsylvania
General Electric employees
Ice hockey executives
National Medal of Technology recipients
People from Harrisburg, Pennsylvania